Habishi (also Romanized as Habīshī, Ḩobeyshī, and Hubaishi; also known as Ḩobeysh and Ḩobeysheh) is a village in Mollasani Rural District, in the Central District of Bavi County, Khuzestan Province, Iran. At the 2006 census, its population was 59, in 12 families.

References 

Populated places in Bavi County